Aframomum polyanthum is a species of plant in the ginger family, Zingiberaceae. It was first described by Karl Moritz Schumann.

References 

polyanthum